Kaiga Generating Station is a nuclear power generating station situated at Kaiga, near the river Kali, in Uttara Kannada district of Karnataka, India. The plant has been in operation since March 2000 and is operated by the Nuclear Power Corporation of India.

It has four units. The fourth unit went critical on 27 November 2010. The two oldest units comprise the west half of the site and the two newer units are adjoining the east side of the site. The older four units are small-sized pressurized heavy water reactors of 220 MW gross.

History 

On 27 November 2010 the Kaiga Atomic Power Station unit 4 of 220 MW capacity became operational.

On 19 January 2011, unit 4 with 220 MW capacity was connected to the southern power grid at 01:56 hours. With this, the total capacity rose to 880 MW gross making it the third largest in India after Tarapur (1400 MW) and Rawatbhata (1180 MW). The unit, fueled by indigenous uranium, will supply electricity to Karnataka, Andhra Pradesh, Kerala, Tamil Nadu and Puducherry.

In December 2018, it got the distinction of setting a world record of continuous operation among all nuclear power plants. As on 10 December 2018, KGS-1, which was synchronized to India's Southern grid on 13 May 2016, continues to operate for a record number of 962 days. Previous record of continuous operation was held by Unit 8 of Heysham II, which operated from 18 February 2014 to 15 September 2016 for a record number of 940 days.

Two PHWR unit, each with a 700 MW capacity, have been planned for this location.  pre-project activities have begun for them and if everything goes as planned the first of the two will become critical around 2024–25.

Units

See also 
 Nuclear power in India

References

External links 
Nuclear power Corporation of India Ltd

Nuclear power stations in Karnataka
2000 establishments in Karnataka
Buildings and structures in Uttara Kannada district
Energy infrastructure completed in 2000
20th-century architecture in India